"Best of Both Worlds" is a song by American rock band Van Halen on their album 5150 that was later released as a single in October 1986.

Background
The song is about Sammy's optimistic look on Van Halen's future, and creating your own luck.  Primarily a guitar-driven song, the second verse includes a few keyboard chords as incidental backing sounds.

Reception
Cash Box said that "the guitar wizardry of Eddie Van Halen charges through the grooves of this song" and also praised Sammy Hagar's vocal performance.  Billboard said it has a "strong pop hook and hedonist philosophy."

In 2011, the song was ranked at #5 on Ultimate Classic Rock's list of the Top 10 Van Hagar Songs. They also ranked the song as best song from 5150.

Personnel
 Sammy Hagar — lead and backing vocals
 Eddie Van Halen — guitar, keyboards, backing vocals
 Michael Anthony — bass guitar, backing vocals
 Alex Van Halen — electronic drums

Charts

References

Van Halen songs
1986 singles
1986 songs
Warner Records singles
Songs written by Sammy Hagar
Songs written by Eddie Van Halen
Songs written by Alex Van Halen
Songs written by Michael Anthony (musician)
Song recordings produced by Mick Jones (Foreigner)